The Mongolian Wikipedia is the Mongolian-language version of the free online encyclopedia Wikipedia. It was created on 28 February 2004. The Mongolian Wikipedia contains  articles. Mongolian Wikipedia is written in the Mongolian Cyrillic alphabet.

Growth, coverage and popularity 
The growth of the Mongolian Wikipedia has been quite intense:

 17 November 2011 – 6,900 articles
 29 May 2012 – 7,593 articles
 29 May 2012 – 273,497 edits

Language and dialects 
Separate Wikipedias have been created for several Mongolian dialects, including Buryat (:bxr:) and Kalmyk (:xal:).

See also 
 Reliability of Wikipedia
 Community of Wikipedia
 History of Wikipedia
 Motivations of Wikipedia contributors

References

External links 

 Mongolian Wikipedia
 Wikipedia Statistics Mongolian — Монгол Википедиатай холбоотой бүх статистик мэдээлэл

Wikipedias by language
Mongolian literature
Asian encyclopedias
Internet properties established in 2004